Crystal Viper is a Polish heavy metal band founded in 2003 by singer and guitarist Marta Gabriel.

History 
During their first three years, Crystal Viper was a project featuring Marta Gabriel and other musicians, with whom she recorded numerous demos, rehearsal tapes and compilation tracks, and played several local live shows. By the summer of 2006, the first official line-up was established, and the project became a regular band. Gabriel would lead as a vocalist and composer: the other members like Lukasz "Andy Wave" Halczuch on the guitar, Tomek "Golem" Danczak on the drums and Tommy Targosz on the bass. The same year, the band recorded their official debut track—a cover version of "Flaming Metal Systems" for the Manilla Road tribute album, The Riddle Masters—and signed a deal with the German label Karthago Records. 

Their debut concept album The Curse Of Crystal Viper was released in early 2007, and followed by The Last Axeman compilation in 2008. Their second studio album Metal Nation was released in 2009. The album would be the first to feature the new bassist Tomasz Woryna, and was co-produced by the King Diamond guitarist Andy LaRocque. Between 2006 and 2009, Crystal Viper was a four piece band in the studio and a five piece band on stage, featuring different musicians at the position of the live rhythm guitarist, until Gabriel took over the duties of a rhythm guitarist as well. Since then, Crystal Viper played as a four piece act both in the studio and on stage.

In 2009, Crystal Viper signed a multiple record deal with AFM Records. They recorded their third studio album Legends for release in 2010. The album featured lyrics based on old Polish legends and stories. In 2012, it was followed by Crimen Excepta, a concept effort about witches and holy inquisition. Due to occupational obligations, Woryna was forced to take a lesser part in the band's activity, and most of the bass parts on Crimen Excepta were recorded by Gabriel. The band did not stop to tour, so Michal Badocha stepped in as the new bass player.

After several live shows around Europe in 2013, Crystal Viper returned to the studio to record the fifth studio album, Possession. Soon after its premiere, due to health issues relating to the band's front woman and founder Gabriel, the band suspended all activities. In 2013, for the first time since 2006, after regular touring in 15 countries, and releasing 5 studio albums, 7 singles and compilations, the future of Crystal Viper was placed into question.

In late 2016, the band announced their return. The comeback album Queen Of The Witches was released after a four-year silence, in February 2017. Like all the previous albums, it was produced by Bart Gabriel (known for his collaboration with acts such as Cirith Ungol, Pagan Altar, Hexx and Sacred Steel). The cover artwork was done by German artist Andreas Marschall, who is known for artworks he made for big-name metal acts such as Running Wild, Blind Guardian and Kreator. Queen Of The Witches is also the first Crystal Viper album recorded with the new bass player, Blaze J. Grygiel. Continuing the band's tradition of paying tribute to classic 1980s metal acts, the band both invited several special guests to partake in the recordings. This included recording two cover songs for the CD and the LP version of the album respectively. Manowar co-founding guitarist Ross the Boss guested on "Do Or Die", while Mantas of Venom played a guitar solo on "Flames And Blood". On the power ballad "We Will Make It Last Forever", Marta Gabriel shares vocal duties with Steve Bettney, vocalist of the NWOBHM cult act Saracen. The album was promoted by two video clips, and a European tour in March–April 2017, during which the band visited Belgium, France, Germany, Austria, Switzerland, Hungary, Czech Republic and Poland.

On 4 June 2018, rhythm guitarist Eric Juris joined the band. On 16 November 2021, drummer Ced departed the band due to private life related matters. He was replaced by Kuba Galwas on 20 June 2022.

Members

Current 
 Marta Gabriel – vocals , bass , guitars 
 Andy Wave – guitars 
 Eric Juris – guitars 
 Kuba Galwas – drums

Former 
 Tomasz "Golem" Dańczak – drums 
 Vicky Vick – rhythm guitar 
 Tomasz Targosz – bass 
 Tomasz Woryna – bass 
 Michal Badocha – bass 
 Błażej "Blaze" Grygiel – bass 
 Cederick "Ced" Forsberg – drums

Timeline

Discography

Albums 
 The Curse of Crystal Viper (2007)
Metal Nation (2009)
 Legends (2010)
 Crimen Excepta (2012)
 Possession (2013)
 Queen of the Witches (2017)
 Tales of Fire and Ice (2019)
 The Cult (2021)

EPs 
 At the Edge of Time (2018)
 The Last Axeman (2022)

Compilation 
 The Last Axeman (2008)
 Sleeping Swords (2009)

Live albums 
 Defenders of the Magic Circle: Live in Germany (2010)

Singles 
 The Wolf and the Witch (2009)
 Stronghold (2009)
 Witch's Mark (2012)
 Fight Evil with Evil (2013)
 The Witch Is Back (2016)
 Still Alive (2019)
 Bright Lights (2019)
 The Cult (2020)

Demos 
 Rehearsal Tape (2003)
 Live Demo (2004)
 Strike One (2005)
 The Soundhouse Tape (2005)

References

External links 
 Spirit of Metal webzine

Polish power metal musical groups
Musical groups established in 2003
Polish heavy metal musical groups
Musical quartets